Doruk (also Romanized as Dorūk) is a village in Frughan Rural District, Rud Ab District, Sabzevar County, Razavi Khorasan Province, Iran. At the 2006 census, its population was 119, in 38 families.

References 

Populated places in Sabzevar County